Matthew James Elwyn Thomas (born 3 March 1988), also occasionally credited as Matthew Thomas, is a British actor who has made appearances in television, film, and theater. He is known for his television roles including the BAFTA and Emmy Award-winning, The Lost Prince, and the ITV drama-musical show, Britannia High. In the U.S., Thomas is best known for having played the title role in the 2013 Broadway revival of Pippin, which received a Tony Award for Best Revival of a Musical. He was also a late addition to the U.S. national tour of Pippin in 2014. He had his Broadway debut in 2010 playing Peter Parker in Spider-Man: Turn Off the Dark directed by Julie Taymor, with music by U2's Bono and Edge.

In 2013, Thomas was nominated for an Outer Critics Circle Award for Outstanding Actor in a Musical for his performance in the title role in Pippin, and, in 2015, he was nominated for a Helen Hayes Award for Outstanding Lead Actor in a Musical for his performance as Fenwick in the Barry Levinson-produced musical, Diner. In 2016 he performed the role of Riff in West Side Story at the Hollywood Bowl with the LA Philharmonic orchestra, conducted by Gustavo Dudamel, alongside fellow Broadway actors Jeremy Jordan and Karen Olivo.

Early life and education
Thomas trained at the Sylvia Young Theatre School in London and later at the Italia Conti Academy of Theatre Arts also in London. He grew up largely in Buckinghamshire, England. His first professional acting job came at the age of 8 when he played Kipper in a production of Oliver! in the West End. As a child, he also appeared as Simon in Billy Elliot and in About a Boy, starring Hugh Grant. Additionally, Thomas made frequent appearances on numerous British television shows, including Wonderful You, The Bill, Bad Girls, and Stephen Poliakoff's The Lost Prince, among others.

Career
For much of his early career, Thomas worked on the screen and stage in films, television shows, musicals, and plays. Prior to coming to Broadway, Thomas acted in numerous London-based and West End plays. He had a featured role as Clarence in Andrew Lloyd Webber's musical version of Whistle Down the Wind. Other UK roles include: Schlomo in Fame, directed by Karen Bruce, Wayne in an adaption of Ben Elton's Novel – Popcorn, directed by Lee Morgan at the Landor Fringe Theatre, Romeo and Juliet, and Dick Whittington, directed by award-winning director Gillian Lynne.

In 2008, Thomas was cast as Jeremy (Jez) Tyler in the ITV television drama musical, Britannia High, created by Arlene Phillips. Over 3,000 people auditioned for roles as one of the six lead characters on the show. The series ran for 9 episodes in the latter half of 2008. Less than a year later, Thomas earned the title role in the musical adaptation of Oscar Wilde's The Picture of Dorian Gray. The musical ran from 2 July to 2 August 2009 at the Leicester Square Theatre. It was directed by Linnie Reedman and the music composed by Joe Evans.

In 2010, Thomas appeared in an episode of the ITV series, Midsomer Murders alongside John Nettles, Sylvestra Le Touzel, Lydia Wilson, and Richard Fleeshman. Also in 2010, Thomas ventured to New York City and Broadway where he earned a role as the alternate lead in Julie Taymor's Spider-Man: Turn Off the Dark. Thomas played Peter Parker/Spider-Man for two performances each week while Reeve Carney took on the role 6 times per week. The play was staged at the Lyric Theatre, which, at the time, was known as the Foxwoods Theatre. In November 2011, Thomas was injured backstage during a Wednesday matinee performance. The injury was not considered serious.

Thomas' final performance as Spider-Man was on 10 November 2012. He left the show to perform in the lead role in the American Repertory Theater's revival of Pippin, directed by Diane Paulus. In 2013, the show moved from Cambridge, Massachusetts to the Music Box Theatre on Broadway. It officially opened at the Music Box on 25 April 2013. During the show's Broadway run, Thomas starred in 8 shows each week, alongside co-stars Patina Miller, Terrence Mann, and Andrea Martin.  Pippin won the Tony Award for Best Revival of a Musical in 2013.

In 2013, Thomas released a three-track EP of original songs entitled, No Sound at All. The album was produced by Duncan Sheik. In early 2014, it was reported that Thomas was in contention for the lead role in the upcoming film, Star Wars: The Force Awakens. At the end of Pippin'''s Broadway run in 2014, Thomas joined his parents in Malta for their anniversary celebration. Almost immediately after arriving, he received a phone call asking him to reprise his role as Pippin for the U.S. national tour, which was opening in Denver in 8 days. Kyle Selig, the actor originally hired to play Pippin for the tour, had been put on vocal rest. Thomas filled in and continued in the role for later dates on the tour, including those for Los Angeles and San Francisco.

In late 2014 and early 2015, Thomas starred as Fenwick in a musical adaptation of Barry Levinson's 1982 film, Diner. The play was produced by Levinson and Scott Landis, and the music was written by Sheryl Crow. The musical was developed at the Signature Theatre in Arlington, Virginia and was directed by Kathleen Marshall. The play was well-received and sold out its entire run at the Signature Theatre.

In March 2015, Thomas appeared as Henry Paine in a pilot episode for a planned HBO drama series, The Devil You Know, co-created by Orange Is the New Black creator Jenji Kohan, but the series was not picked up and the pilot went unaired. In 2017 he appeared in the main cast of another pilot episode, for a planned medical drama, Shelter, created by Law & order veteran Warren Leight, but the series was again not picked up.

Recognition and awards
Thomas played the title role in Pippin, which won the 2013 Tony Award for Best Revival of a Musical. The musical was nominated for a total of 10 awards and won 4. Thomas' performance in Pippin earned him a nomination for Outstanding Lead Actor in a Musical by the Outer Critics Circle Awards. In 2015, Thomas was nominated for the Helen Hayes Award for Outstanding Lead Actor in a Musical (HAYES Production) for his performance in Diner.

List of credits
Television

 Theatre credits 

Film

DiscographyOverrated Life''* (2005)

References

External links
 
 
 twitter.com/matthewjethomas

1988 births
Living people
English male film actors
English male musical theatre actors
English male television actors
20th-century English male actors
21st-century English male actors
Alumni of the Italia Conti Academy of Theatre Arts